The candidate information for the Bramford and Blakenham Ward in Mid-Suffolk, Suffolk, England. This pages shows the results of the latest election on Thursday 5 May 2011. This ward elects two councillors.

Councillors

2011 Results

2015 Results
The turnout of the election was 71.64%.

See also
Mid Suffolk local elections

References

External links
Mid Suffolk Council

Wards of Mid Suffolk District